Jammu and Kashmir, officially known as the Princely State of Kashmir and Jammu, was a princely state during the Company rule from 1846 to 1858 as well as the British Raj in India from 1858 to 1952. The princely state was created after the First Anglo-Sikh War, from the territories that had earlier been in the Sikh Empire. After the Partition of India in 1947, roughly a third of the state came under Pakistani control, and the rest remains disputed under Indian control. The India–Pakistan dispute regarding the accession remains unresolved.

Administration

According to the census reports of 1911, 1921 and 1931, the administration was organised as follows:
 Jammu province: Districts of Jammu, Jasrota (Kathua), Udhampur, Reasi and Mirpur.
 Kashmir province: Districts of Kashmir South (Anantnag), Kashmir North (Baramulla) and Muzaffarabad.
 Frontier districts: Wazarats of Ladakh and Gilgit.
 Internal jagirs: Poonch, Bhaderwah and Chenani.
In the 1941 census, further details of the frontier districts were given:
 Ladakh wazarat: Tehsils of Leh, Skardu and Kargil.
 Gilgit wazarat: Tehsils of Gilgit and Astore
 Frontier illaqas: (under the Gilgit Agency) Punial, Ishkoman,  Yasin, Kuh-Ghizer, Hunza, Nagar, Chilas.

Prime Ministers (Jammu & Kashmir)

See also
 List of political parties in Jammu and Kashmir (princely state)
 Tehreek-e-Azaadi Jammu and Kashmir
 Revocation of the special status of Jammu and Kashmir
 Dogra dynasty

References

Bibliography

 
 
 
 
 
 
 
 
 
 
 
 
 

Princely states of India
Jammu and Kashmir (princely state)
1846 establishments in British India
1952 disestablishments in India
Rajputs
Hindu governments
Rajput princely states
Former monarchies